Alvin Daniel (born 30 August 1969) is a retired track and field athlete from Trinidad and Tobago who specialized in the 200 and 400 metres.

He holds one national record, in 4 x 400 metres relay together with Patrick Delice, Neil de Silva and Ian Morris, with 3:01.05 minutes achieved in the heats of the 1992 Summer Olympics.

International competitions

1Did not start in the final

References

External links

1969 births
Living people
Trinidad and Tobago male sprinters
Olympic athletes of Trinidad and Tobago
Athletes (track and field) at the 1992 Summer Olympics
Pan American Games competitors for Trinidad and Tobago
Athletes (track and field) at the 1987 Pan American Games
Athletes (track and field) at the 1991 Pan American Games
Athletes (track and field) at the 1995 Pan American Games
Commonwealth Games competitors for Trinidad and Tobago
Athletes (track and field) at the 1990 Commonwealth Games
Athletes (track and field) at the 1994 Commonwealth Games
World Athletics Championships athletes for Trinidad and Tobago
Central American and Caribbean Games silver medalists for Trinidad and Tobago
Competitors at the 1990 Central American and Caribbean Games
World Athletics Indoor Championships medalists
Central American and Caribbean Games medalists in athletics